William Noll (March 23, 1834 – March 23, 1908) was a German-born American businessman and politician who served as a member of the Wisconsin State Assembly in 1876.

Background
Noll was born in Hübingen, Germany. He became a hardware merchant. Noll was a member of the Wisconsin State Assembly in 1876 as a Republican. He served as town clerk of Lyndon, Sheboygan County, Wisconsin in 1875 and a supervisor of the town of Lyndon in 1877. Noll died on March 23, 1908, in Marshfield, Wisconsin.

References

People from Westerwaldkreis
People from Lyndon, Sheboygan County, Wisconsin
People from Marshfield, Wisconsin
Businesspeople from Wisconsin
Wisconsin city council members
Republican Party members of the Wisconsin State Assembly
City and town clerks
1834 births
1908 deaths
German emigrants to the United States
19th-century American politicians
19th-century American businesspeople